Thomas James Schleiter (born May 8, 1986), better known by the name Tommy English, is an American songwriter and producer best known for his music production, sound engineering, and songwriting. In 2018, he secured a Grammy nomination for his contributions to the album Everywhere Is Some Where by K.Flay.

Career 
Growing up in the northwest suburbs of Chicago, English spent most of his youth playing soccer, writing songs and learning how to play instruments such as the piano, trumpet, drums and guitar. His parents stressed music education for which he is very thankful. English mainly works out of Studio America, his music studios in Los Angeles, CA and Nashville, TN.

English began his career as a musician at the age of 19 when his band Powerspace signed to a label.  He was also lead guitarist for the band "Bad City". Two years after graduating from Miami University, English decided to explore a solo career as a producer and songwriter. He moved back to Chicago where he focused on engineering and music production. After gaining these skills he moved to Los Angeles where he began working in sound engineering. He later began producing on his own and began working with artists such as Adam Lambert, BØRNS, K. Flay, Broods, and Kacey Musgraves.

Works 
Set It Off, Duality (producer, 2014)
BØRNS, Dopamine (songwriter/producer, 2015)
Ladyhawke, Wild Things (songwriter/producer, 2016)
Against the Current, In Our Bones (songwriter/producer, 2016)
Dagny, Ultraviolet EP (songwriter/producer, 2016)
That Poppy, "Money" (songwriter/producer, 2016)
Andrew McMahon in the Wilderness, Zombies on Broadway (producer, 2017)
K. Flay, Every Where Is Some Where (producer, 2017)
BØRNS, Blue Madonna (songwriter/producer, 2017) 
Kacey Musgraves, "High Horse" (songwriter, 2018)
 Your Smith, Bad Habit (producer, 2018)
Dagny "That Feeling When" (songwriter/producer, 2018) 
The Knocks, New York Narcotic (songwriter/producer, 2018)
Broods, Don't Feed the Pop Monster (songwriter/producer, 2019)
Carly Rae Jepsen, Dedicated (songwriter/producer, 2019)
Adam Lambert, Velvet: Side A (songwriter/producer, 2019)

References 

1986 births
Living people